Michael P. Kushmerek (born 1986) is an American politician in Fitchburg, Massachusetts representing 3rd Worcester District (Fitchburg) in the Massachusetts state house of representatives.

Early life 
Kushmerek grew up in Saugus, attended Fitchburg State University, where he received a bachelor's degree in history and political science in 2008 and a masters degree in history in 2013.

Political career 
Kushmerek was elected ward 4 representative in the Fitchburg City council in 2014, in 2016 He was elected city council president, in 2019 he was elected councilor at large.

In 2020, Kushmerek was elected to represent the 3rd Worcester District (Fitchburg and Lunenburg, Precinct B) in the Massachusetts House of Representatives to succeed fellow Democrat Stephan Hay, defeating Republican Glenn Fossa. He was sworn in on January 6, 2021.

Personal life 
Kushmerek is married to Carissa (Scottfenton) Kushmerek. Before his election, he worked as a director at Northeastern University, Worcester Polytechnic Institute, and Fitchburg State University.

See also
 2021–2022 Massachusetts legislature
 2020 Massachusetts House of Representatives election

References 

Living people
Democratic Party members of the Massachusetts House of Representatives
Fitchburg State University alumni
People from Saugus, Massachusetts
Politicians from Fitchburg, Massachusetts
1987 births